Mohsen Rohami (also spelt Rahami) is an Iranian lawyer, Shia cleric and reformist politician. He is an associate professor at University of Tehran's department of criminal crime.

He enrolled as a candidate in the 2017 Iranian presidential election.

References

External links

Living people
Islamic Association of University Instructors politicians
Members of the 1st Islamic Consultative Assembly
Members of the 2nd Islamic Consultative Assembly
Iranian Shia clerics
20th-century Iranian lawyers
1953 births
National Trust Party (Iran) politicians
People from Zanjan Province
Deputies of Khodabandeh
Members of the Reformists' Supreme Council for Policymaking
Secretaries-General of political parties in Iran
Iranian campaign managers
21st-century Iranian lawyers